Davys may refer to:

Surname:
Paul Davys, 1st Viscount Mount Cashell (1670–1716), Irish peer of the early eighteenth century
Ali Davys (born 1970), former rugby league footballer
Arthur Davys (died 1733), Irish Member of Parliament from 1713 to 1714
George Davys (1780–1864), English cleric, tutor to Victoria of the United Kingdom, and later Bishop of Peterborough
John Davys (died 1689) (1646–1689), Irish politician
Mary Davys (1674–1732), novelist and playwright
Michael Gwynne Douglas Davys (1922–2002), British psychiatrist who specialised in depression in children
Owen Davys (1794–1875), Archdeacon of Northampton from 1842 until his death
Paul Davys (1600–1672), Irish politician and civil servant, Clerk to the Privy Council of Ireland, Secretary of State (Ireland)
William Davys (1633–1687), Irish barrister and judge, Recorder of Dublin, Prime Serjeant and Lord Chief Justice of Ireland

Given name:
Thomas Reid Davys Bell (1863–1948), Irish lepidopterist, naturalist and forest officer in India
John Davys Beresford (1873–1947), English writer remembered for science fiction, horror and ghost stories

See also
Davies
Davis (surname)
Davis (given name)
Dāvis
Daviess (disambiguation)